Budur is a village in the Tiruvallur district of Tamil Nadu, India. It is located in the Gummidipoondi taluk.

Demographics 

According to the 2011 census of India, Budur has 495 households. The effective literacy rate (i.e. the literacy rate of population excluding children aged 6 and below) is 62.01%.

References 

Villages in Gummidipoondi taluk